Amauroceras is an extinct genus of eoderoceratacean ammonites in the family Amaltheidae.

References
Notes

Bibliography
 Arkell et al., 1957. Mesozoic Ammonoidea. Treatise on Invertebrate Paleontology, Part L; Geological Society of America and University Kansas press.

Ammonitida genera
Eoderoceratoidea
Jurassic ammonites of North America
Pliensbachian life